The Turbotrain was any of several French high-speed, gas turbine trains. The earliest Turbotrain entered service in 1967, for use on France's SNCF intercity lines. There were four versions in total, with the last exiting service in 2005, and it is the Turbotrain that made advances possible for the TGV.

TGS (Turbine à gaz spéciale) Prototype – XR 8575 trainset 

In 1967, the SNCF converted a 2-car X 4300 Class diesel multiple unit train originally built by ANF Industrie (Ateliers Construction du Nord de la France) starting in 1963 (either train number X4375 or X4365), into the prototype experimental Turbotrain TGS (Turbine à gaz spéciale). The new gas-turbine engine was installed into the trailer car of this 2-car set; the original diesel power-car was fitted with a new cab but retained its original diesel motor and transmission.

Trials started on 25 April 1967. The TGS reached  on 15 October 1971.

Class T 1000 ETG (Élément à Turbine à Gaz) trains 

This is the first-generation of production Turbotrains. These ETG (Elément à Turbine à Gaz) trains were four carriage trainsets which offered 188 seats and possessed one diesel engine and one gas turbine engine. The gas-turbine engine was an 820 kW Turbomeca Turmo IIIF3 gas-turbine Voith hydraulic (derived from a helicopter turbine) and the diesel was a 320 kW Saurer SDHR diesel-mechanical. These trains reached . The ETGs entered service in 1971 on the Paris-Caen-Cherbourg. A total of 14 of these four-car trainsets were manufactured from 1969–1972 by ANF.  These trains were maintained at the Venissieux trainshed in Lyon for "many years", but were moved to the Lyon Vaise depot in the 1980s. Electrification of the Grenoble line caused some trainsets to be shifted to work in Clermont Ferrand and Metz.

Class T 2000 RTG (Rame à Turbine à Gaz) trains 

These trains had five carriages with 280 seats and were built between 1972 and 1976 by ANF and MTE (Societe de Materiel de Traction Electrique). Forty-one RTG trainsets were manufactured for SNCF service. These trains were equipped with one  Turmo IIIF1 gas turbine in the even-numbered cabs and one Turmo XII  gas turbine in the odd-numbered cabs, reaching . Normally, the even-numbered  engine was shut down once the train reached cruising speeds. The RTG entered service in 1973 on the Strasbourg-Lyon and Lyon-Nantes lines, it subsequently entered service on the Paris-Caen-Cherbourg and Paris-Deauville-Dives-Cabourg lines in 1975. The electrification of the Paris-Caen-Cherbourg line in 1996 moved the RTGs onto the Lyon-Bordeaux line until 2005.

In later years, the SNCF RTG trainsets were modified to allow two RTG trains to be operated together by one driver as a multiple-unit train.

Export models 
 
Six examples of the RTG were built by ANF for Amtrak and were dubbed Turboliners in the United States. These RTG Turboliners were first imported into the United States in 1973 and "impressed with their reliability" and proliferated with further orders from France and license-production in the United States by Rohr.

The Egyptian National Railways purchased three enlarged 10-car turbotrains manufactured by ANF for a planned  service on the 208 km route between Cairo and Alexandria.

TGV 001 experimental high-speed train 

The research program from this prototype, and from the Z7001 Zebulon electric test train, provided data used for the design of the later electric TGV trains.

Preservation 
One RTG is kept in running condition at the French National Railway Museum in Mulhouse.

See also
Gas turbine-electric locomotive
SNCF
 Turbine-electric transmission
 Turboshaft

References

SNCF multiple units
High-speed trains of France
Gas turbine multiple units of France